Haim Gamzu (1910-1982) (also Haim Gamzou) was an Israeli art and drama critic.

Biography

Haim Gamzu was born in Chernihiv in the Russian Empire (now Ukraine). In 1923, his family immigrated to Mandatory Palestine. Gamzu studied art and philosophy at the Sorbonne and University of Vienna.

His son Yossi Gamzu was a professor of poetry.

Art history and theater career
Gamzu was appointed director of the Tel Aviv Museum in 1962. He established Israel's first theater school, Beit Zvi, in Ramat Gan.

Gamzu wrote several books on Israeli painting and sculpture, and worked for Haaretz newspaper as an art and theater critic.

Known for his acerbic theater reviews, Gamzu's surname was turned into a new Hebrew verb, ligmoz, which means to pan a theater show.

See also
Theater of Israel
Visual arts in Israel

References

1910 births
1982 deaths
People from Chernihiv
Israeli art critics
Israeli academics
Israeli historians